Diesel Loco Shed, Vatva is an engine shed located in Vatva, Gujarat in India. It is located north-east of  falling under Ahmedabad railway division. The shed caters to the need of freight as well as passenger trains.

It is one of  the three diesel loco sheds in the Western Railway zone, others are Ratlam and Sabarmati .

History 

It was established on 11 November 1981 with capacity holding of 15 locomotives, but currently it holds around 126 locomotives, WDM-3D, WDG-3A, WDM-3A, WDS-6 and WDS-4B class.  It received its first locomotive, a WDM-2, from Diesel Loco Shed, Ratlam.

Major and minor schedules of Diesel Locomotives are carried out in the shed. The shed is ISO: ISO 9002:1994, ISO 9001:2000, ISO 9001:2008 certified.

Locomotives

See also 

 Diesel Loco Shed, Mhow
 Diesel Loco Shed, Sabarmati

References

External links 

 Railway Board - Official Website
 Western Railway - Official Website

Vatva
1981 establishments in Gujarat
Transport infrastructure completed in 1981